The 2020–21 Ball State Cardinals men's basketball team represented Ball State University in the 2020–21 NCAA Division I men's basketball season. The Cardinals, led by eighth-year head coach James Whitford, played their home games at Worthen Arena as members of the Mid-American Conference. Starting this season, the MAC announced the removal of divisions.

Previous season
The Cardinals finished the 2019–20 season 18–13, 11–7, to finish in a tie for first place in the MAC West division. They were scheduled to play Kent State in the quarterfinals of the MAC tournament, but the remainder of the tournament was cancelled amid the COVID-19 pandemic.

Roster

Schedule and results 

|-
!colspan=12 style=| Regular season

|-
!colspan=12 style=| MAC tournament
|-

|-

Source

References

Ball State Cardinals men's basketball seasons
Ball State Cardinals
Ball State Cardinals men's basketball
Ball State Cardinals men's basketball